Richard Leonard Harris (14 October 1885 – 31 October 1945) was an Australian rules footballer who played for Essendon, Carlton and St Kilda in the Victorian Football League (VFL).

Harris was a defender and played his early football with North Melbourne in the Victorian Football Association (VFA). He joined Essendon in 1905 and made three appearances before crossing to Carlton the following season.

In the 1907 semi final against St Kilda, Harris was moved to full-forward and starred with three goals. As a result, he remained near goals for the Grand Final and earned a premiership. He retired after the win but returned to action in 1909, now back in defence.

He finished his career at St Kilda where he played two seasons.

References

Blueseum: Dick Harris
Holmesby, Russell and Main, Jim (2007). The Encyclopedia of AFL Footballers. 7th ed. Melbourne: Bas Publishing.
Essendon Football Club profile

1885 births
Australian rules footballers from Melbourne
Essendon Football Club players
Carlton Football Club players
Carlton Football Club Premiership players
St Kilda Football Club players
North Melbourne Football Club (VFA) players
1945 deaths
One-time VFL/AFL Premiership players
People from Carlton, Victoria